John Francis Kirby (born 1963) is a retired rear admiral in the United States Navy serving as Coordinator for Strategic Communications at the National Security Council in the White House since late May 2022. He previously served as Pentagon Press Secretary for the first year and a half of the Biden Administration, and worked as a military and diplomatic analyst for CNN from 2017 to 2021. He served in the Obama administration as the spokesperson for the United States Department of State from 2015 to 2017.

Early life and education
Kirby grew up in St. Petersburg, Florida.  He is a 1981 graduate of Saint Petersburg Catholic High School, and a 1985 graduate of the University of South Florida in Tampa, Florida, where he earned a Bachelor of Arts degree in history. He holds a Master of Science degree in international relations from Troy University and a Master of Arts in national security and strategic studies from the Naval War College.

Military career
Kirby was commissioned in September 1986 after completing Officer Candidate School at Naval Station Newport, Rhode Island. He qualified as a Surface Warfare Officer aboard the guided-missile frigate  before being designated as a restricted line officer, to service as a public affairs officer (PAO).

As a public affairs officer, Kirby served at sea aboard the aircraft carrier  and on the staff of Commander, U.S. 2nd Fleet, embarked aboard the command-and-control ship .

While ashore, Kirby completed tours as an instructor at the U.S. Naval Academy; public affairs officer with the Navy Flight Demonstration Squadron (Blue Angels); editor-in-chief of the Navy's flagship monthly magazine, All Hands; the staffs of the Chief of Naval Personnel, Commander of U.S. Naval Forces Europe, Chief of Naval Operations, and the special assistant for public affairs to the Chairman of the Joint Chiefs of Staff.

He served as the deputy assistant secretary of defense for media operations, serving under the Assistant Secretary of Defense for Public Affairs.

In May 2012, Kirby was promoted to rear admiral (lower half) and served as the U.S. Navy's Chief of Information (CHINFO). As CHINFO, Kirby served as the principal spokesman for the Department of the Navy and providing strategic communication counsel to the Secretary of the Navy and the Chief of Naval Operations. He led the Navy's public affairs community, which consists of more than 2,700 active and reserve officer, enlisted, and civilian communication professionals.

Career

Obama administration 
In December 2013, Kirby was appointed Pentagon press secretary by Defense Secretary Chuck Hagel. In May 2014, Kirby was promoted to rear admiral. In October 2014, Senator John McCain disputed Kirby's contention that the U.S. was winning its war against the Islamic State of Iraq and Syria, and called him an "idiot". On April 22, 2015, it was announced that Kirby would be the new spokesman for the United States Department of State after he retired from the military later in the year.

Kirby became spokesman for the State Department on May 12, 2015. In October 2016, Kirby defended the Saudi Arabian-led intervention in Yemen against the Shia Houthis. He left office following the inauguration of President Trump on January 20, 2017.

2017-2021

Biden administration 
On January 14, 2021, Kirby was tapped to reprise his role as Pentagon press secretary by President Biden.

On March 11, 2021, Kirby condemned Tucker Carlson for his comments that accommodations for women in uniform, particularly maternity wear and haircut regulations, somehow reduce the readiness and effectiveness of the United States military.

On May 19, 2022, the White House announced that Kirby would be leaving the Pentagon to join the National Security Council as Coordinator for Strategic Communications. In this role, Kirby will "coordinate inter-agency efforts to explain United States policy and will serve as a senior administration voice on related matters".

Awards
Kirby has been awarded the Navy Distinguished Service Medal, Defense Superior Service Medal, Legion of Merit, Meritorious Service Medal (four awards), Joint Service Commendation Medal, Navy and Marine Corps Commendation Medal (four awards), and Navy and Marine Corps Achievement Medal, as well as various campaign and service awards.

References

External links

 Professional CV from US Navy website
 Kirby's former Twitter account (archived)

|-

|-

|-

1963 births
CNN people
Living people
Military personnel from Florida
Naval War College alumni
People from St. Petersburg, Florida
Recipients of the Meritorious Service Medal (United States)
Troy University alumni
United States Assistant Secretaries of State
United States Department of Defense officials
United States Department of State spokespeople
United States Navy rear admirals (upper half)
University of South Florida alumni
Biden administration personnel